Lithops naureeniae is a species of pebble plant (Lithops).  It is classified under the family Aizoaceae. The succulent is native to Southern Africa and has the ability to withstand the desert climate in which it lives. L. naureeniae was identified in 1980 by Desmond Cole, who became involved in Lithops research in 1947, from a specimen provided to him by Bruce Bayer, curator of the Karoo Botanic Garden, having been collected by Peter V. Bruyns in Namaqualand. It is named after Cole's wife, Naureen Cole. Cole wrote:

Description 
The succulent has pink to pale-reddish leaves, which grow in pairs of two and clump together in multiple heads. It sprouts yellow flowers with a white center.

References 

naureeniae